Fort McMurray International Airport  is an airport located  southeast of Fort McMurray, Alberta, Canada. YMM is the largest airport in northern Alberta. It has flights to Edmonton, Calgary, and Fort Chipewyan through airlines Air Canada, WestJet, McMurray Aviation and Northwestern Air. 

The airport is managed by the Fort McMurray Airport Authority, a community-based not-for-profit organization that has operated YMM since 2010.

In 2014, YMM served 1,308,417 passengers, ranking it as the 15th busiest airport in Canada. As a result, a new $258 million airport terminal facility opened in 2014 that can accommodate 1.5 million passengers per year. 

Canada Border Services Agency (CBSA) established service at the airport in 2013.

History

Early years 
Early 20th-century flights to Fort McMurray were primarily float planes that used the Snye River, a waterway that linked Clearwater River to the larger Athabasca River (private floatplanes still use the waterway). The first landing strip for light planes was built in 1936 to connect Fort McMurray with Edmonton.

World War Two 
In 1942, Canadian Pacific Airlines upgraded the landing strip. That same year, with the United States entering World War II, the United States Army Air Forces took over the airfield and made further improvements to service Allied air military operations in the Europe and Pacific war theatres. In 1944, the USAAF transferred custody of the airstrip back to the Canadian Department of Transport (now Transport Canada).

Post-war years 

Pacific Western Airlines took over management of the airport from the late 1950s to 1960s. In 1962, the airline company built the first permanent air terminal building.

Transport Canada continued to operate and make improvements to the airport from the 1960s to 1990s. The first permanent control tower was commissioned in 1981 and a larger  terminal opened in 1986 to accommodate 250,000 passengers per year.

Creation of airport authority 
In 1999, the Regional Municipality of Wood Buffalo created the Regional Airport Commission to take over management of the airport from Transport Canada. Ongoing development in the Athabasca oil sands led to massive passenger growth and aircraft traffic.

In 2009, the Regional Airport Commission incorporated an airport authority. The first airport authority Board was formed in 2010 to become the Fort McMurray Airport Authority (FMAA), which presently manages YMM.

Recent developments 
YMM became the fastest-growing airport in Canada in the early 2010s, with air activity records shattered in 2013 and 2014. YMM served 1.2 million passengers in 2013, and 1.3 million passengers in 2014. YMM went from the 16th busiest airport in Canada in 2011 to 15th busiest in 2014.

Many passengers included people from outside Canada – particularly foreign workers for the Athabasca oil sands. To make it easier for work and leisure air travel, the Canada Border Services Agency (CBSA) created a permanent border entry into Canada at YMM in 2013.

Larger passenger numbers created crowded conditions at the original terminal. The FMAA built a new $258 million airport terminal that was five times larger than the original and able to accommodate up to 1.5 million passengers per year. The new terminal was opened to passengers on June 9, 2014.

The airport temporarily ceased operations on May 4, 2016 due to an out-of-control wildfire in Fort McMurray. Some minor damage occurred to outer structures, but the primary buildings remained intact.

Terminals 

YMM has two terminals. The large main terminal, that opened in 2014, is located on the south side of the runway and is used for commercial passenger service. The original terminal, opened in 1986, is located on the north side of the runway and was renovated and re-opened in 2014 to exclusively serve workforce charters, corporate flyers, and cargo.

Main terminal 
The main terminal building serves commercial passengers and houses CBSA where international travellers and returning Canadians enter the country. The terminal has four passenger bridges and eight aircraft parking stands.

The terminal has many services for passengers, including:
 a customer service and visitor information centre
 a public observation area with interactive learning exhibits
 a children's play area
 a naturally heated courtyard with a travelling pet relief area
 free wireless service and USB charging stations in all passenger lounge seats

Concessions 

The main terminal has six retail, food, and beverage outlets on both sides of security. Some of the major brands are:
 Best Buy Express
 Burger King
 Earls Kitchen + Bar
 Nicholby's Convenience Stores
 Tim Hortons

On April 22, 2015, YMM received first place in the "Best Food & Beverage Program – Medium/Small Airport" category at the Airports Council International – North America (ACI-NA) Excellence in Airport Concessions Awards.

North Terminal 
The North Terminal was originally built for both commercial and private passenger services. After the opening of the new main terminal in 2014, the building was renovated and re-opened as the North Terminal to serve workforce charters, corporate fliers and cargo.

The North Terminal supports about 250,000 workers a year, or 20 percent of all YMM passengers annually. Charter carriers, including Canadian North, Enerjet, Flair Air and North Cariboo Air operate through the terminal.  The terminal has retail, food and beverage, and car rental services. It also handles air cargo operations such as a dedicated cargo depot, storage and sorting space as well as ramp space for cargo aircraft.

Architecture 

The interior of YMM's main terminal has a unique north-eastern Alberta theme, emphasizing the boreal forests that cover the Wood Buffalo region's landscape and the green, blue and gold colors of the aurora borealis that are prominently seen in the night sky of the Canadian north.

The main terminal architecture was designed by office of Mcfarlane Biggar Architects + Designers Inc (OMB) of North Vancouver, British Columbia. The design was recognized as one of 11 recipients of the 2013 Canadian Architect Award of Excellence, for embodying qualities of innovation and overall design excellence. In 2018, it was one of 12 recipients of the Governor General's Medals in Architecture.

Pine roof 

The most striking feature is the unique laminated pine wood beam used to support the roof, which is the largest of this type of material in North America. Some  of pine wood material was used to build the roof using engineered timber reclaimed from forested areas in interior British Columbia that were devastated by pine beetle infestation in the mid-2000s. The exposed mass timber structure complements the other refined yet durable materials used for the terminal's interior, including triple glazed windows, terrazzo flooring and acoustic wood panels.

Public art 

YMM has a collection of art by artists locally and across Western Canada that showcases the unique look and character of Fort McMurray and the Wood Buffalo region. These art pieces include:

 the suspended sculpture Daedalist by David Robinson of Vancouver
 the photographic collage Waterways by Liz Ingram of Edmonton
 the paintings Lasting Impression and Sky Explorer by Lucas Seaward of Fort McMurray (which uses bitumen as part of the palette)
 the painting Sky Dance by Amy Keller-Rempp of Fort McMurray
 the painting series Utopia by Jane Ash Poitras of Fort Chipewyan

The Northern Lights mural in the arrivals hall features the aurora borealis and boreal forests for the Wood Buffalo region, and unites all the other thematic features of the main terminal.

Observation area 

YMM has an interactive public observation area with educational exhibits showcasing Fort McMurray's aviation history. These exhibits include:

 a mural of famous pilots that operated in northern Alberta in the early to mid-20th century
 a rotating historical artifacts collection of aviation equipment and heirlooms donated by the Fort McMurray Historical Society, the Alberta Aviation Museum and the Canadian Aviation Hall of Fame
 interactive video screens that take visitors through a virtual timeline of northern Alberta's aviation history
 telescopes for viewing airfield activity

Exterior art pieces 

The three towers are illuminated after sunset with colours similar to the aurora borealis. YMM also has two  illuminated welcome signs with a replica of a Canadian Forces Snowbirds aircraft.

Accessibility 

The new YMM airport terminal is outfitted with automatic doors, ramps and lifts, and the food court and passenger lounges have barrier-free seating areas. Accessible parking stalls are located closest to the main terminal, with users required to display a disabled person or veteran licence plate, or a disabled parking placard in the windshield.

Persons with wheelchairs or other mobility-assist devices can arrange for special assistance with airlines. Ramps and curb cuts are available at both arrivals and departures, and an enlarged drop-off stall for wheelchairs is located on the departures level.

YMM has washrooms accessible to passengers with either limited mobility, have infants and young children, or require a companion. Washrooms have screen walls in place of doors, stalls and sinks that are accessible to everyone, low counter tops and automated faucets and paper towel dispensers. The terminal has a companion care rest room in the arrivals hall for travellers needing companion assistance. Family rooms are located across from all common washrooms.

Certified service animals such as seeing-eye dogs are allowed in the terminal. The outdoor courtyard is also a pet relief area, equipped with plastic bags and animal waste disposal receptacles.

Visitor and Customer Information Centre 

YMM hosts a Visitor and Customer Information Centre through partnerships with the Regional Municipality of Wood Buffalo and Fort McMurray Tourism. The centre is in the arrivals hall and available to help passengers. Some of the services offered include finding accommodations, securing transportation or assisting visitors in planning their stay while they are in Fort McMurray.

Community involvement 

YMM's Community Investment Program (CIP) helps community organizations in three core areas:
 Youth – programs that provide educational opportunities to youth
 Aviation Education and History – programs that preserve and educate about northern Alberta's rich aviation history
 Canada's Military – programs that support men and women who serve or have served in the Canadian Armed Forces
In 2014, CIP provided $200,000 in funding to organizations including the Wood Buffalo YMCA, the Royal Canadian Air Cadets, and the Wood Buffalo Food Bank. YMM also encourages its employees to volunteer in their community through the employee volunteer matching program.

Sustainability 

YMM has many energy-saving and sustainable features installed in the new airport terminal that increase the building's lifespan while reducing its carbon footprint.

The main terminal's exterior is also very robust, designed to withstand the northern winter climate. These exterior materials include pre-weathered steel panels and pre-cast panels as well as layers of thick, airtight insulation to minimize excess heat loss.

The main terminal is outfitted with several energy-saving features, including:
 in-floor radiant heat for warming
 passive ventilation for cooling
 heat recovery systems that recycle excess heat back into the building
 high windows and ceilings that allow in ample natural light
 flexible overall layout for changing airline and security requirements

Airlines and destinations

Passenger

Cargo

Over half of cargo at YMM is handled by dedicated air cargo carriers while Air Canada and WestJet carry the remainder on scheduled passenger flights. The air cargo facility in the short term will operate out of the North Terminal. A new third-party air cargo building with an expanded apron is planned to be built east of the North Terminal.

Statistics

Annual traffic

Ground transportation

Taxi/shuttle
YMM has many taxi/shuttle services passengers can use, including:
 24-hour licensed taxi service, including wheelchair accessible units
 limo services (luxury sedans, SUVs, stretch limos)
 private shuttle service to hotels or worksites, based on individual arrangements

Six major rental car brands also operate at YMM:
 Avis
 Budget
 Driving Force
 Enterprise
 Hertz
 National

Transit

The Wood Buffalo Transit operates a bus route (Route 11) between downtown Fort McMurray and YMM seven days a week, with stops at eight major hotels and at Keyano College. The bus stop is located curbside on the arrivals level.

Parking
YMM offers over 2,200 parking stalls equipped with power outlets, including 430 short-term parking stalls and over 1,400 long-term parking stalls.

Expansion 

The Main Terminal building will also be expanded to include two additional gates. The Regional Municipality of Wood Buffalo has also committed $25 million to support the project, with the FMAA responsible for the remaining one-third of the budget.

Future expansion plans for the airport include:
 a hotel attached to the main terminal
 a new air cargo facility
 a quick turnaround car rental services facility
 a new control tower
 a shared facility for Airport Rescue and Fire Fighting (ARFF) services and airport maintenance

FBOs

YMM has two fixed-base operators that service aircraft:
 Universal Aviation
 Executive Flight Centre

Other facilities 

YMM has ten essential aviation services operating on its property, including:
 avionics
 air ambulance
 charter services
 corporate services
 search and rescue
 aircraft maintenance
 firefighting services
 helicopter services
 flight schools
 private and recreational flying

Commercial land development 

YMM has a total  of land available for commercial development, divided into seven commercial parks. Uses of the land may include:
 gas stations
 offices
 warehouses
 light manufacturing plants
 public utilities
 transportation services

See also
List of airports in the Fort McMurray area

References

External links

Fort McMurray International Airport

Places to Fly airport directory from the Canadian Owners and Pilots Association

Certified airports in Fort McMurray
Transport in the Regional Municipality of Wood Buffalo